Walbundrie  is a village in the eastern Riverina district of New South Wales, Australia. Walbundrie is in the Greater Hume Shire local government area. Billabong Creek passes immediately south of the town.

Piney Range Post Office opened on 1 March 1869 and was renamed Walbundrie later that month.

The major industry in and around Walbundrie is agriculture, including grain production and wool growing.

Sport and Recreation
The first published details of an Australian rules football club in Walbundrie was in 1906 when they played a match against Corowa Football Club in Corowa.

As of 2022 Australian rules football and netball are the most popular sport in Walbundrie and the club plays in the Hume Football League, fielding four football teams and five netball under the merged club's name of Rand - Walbundrie Walla Giants Football and Netball Club. The Rand Walbundrie Walla Giants FNC is a Sports Club formed after the amalgamation between the Rand Walbundrie Tigers & the Walla Hoppers in 2016.

Walbundrie Football Association.
This Australian rules football competition existed for one season only, consisting of the following clubs - Bulgandra, Burrumbuttock, Walbundrie and Walla. Bulgandra: 5.4 - 34 defeated Walla: 4.8 - 32 in the grand final.

Gallery

References

External links

Greater Hume Shire Council - Official site

Towns in the Riverina
Towns in New South Wales